Natatolana rusteni is a species of crustacean in the family Cirolanidae, and was first described by Stephen John Keable in 2006. The species epithet, rusteni, honours Mr Jim Rusten, a former storeman at the Australian Museum.

It is a benthic species, living at depths of about 5-50 m in subtropical waters, off the east coast of Australia in the Central Eastern Shelf Province and Central Eastern Shelf Transition IMCRA zones. It is a scavenger.

References

External links
Natatolana rusteni occurrence data from GBIF

Cymothoida
Crustaceans of Australia
Crustaceans described in 2006
Taxa named by Stephen John Keable